Book of My Mother is a 1954 memoir by the Swiss writer Albert Cohen. It focuses on the life of Cohen's mother. It was published in English in 1997.

Reception
The book was reviewed in Publishers Weekly in 1998: "In this intensely public forum, Cohen seems to be coming to grips with his mother's death through all the typical stages of mourning--numbness, denial, anger, guilt--with pen in hand. Although this process is not without its bouts of melodrama ('O Maman, my youth that is no more!'), other outbursts powerfully reflect a disgust with mortality and a baffled sense of abandonment. ... This is a heartbreaking little volume, worth reading twice."

See also
 1954 in literature
 Swiss literature

References

1954 non-fiction books
Swiss memoirs
Works by Albert Cohen
Éditions Gallimard books